The Michael Foley Cottage is a historic house at 14 Emerson Street in Stoneham, Massachusetts.  It is a remarkably well preserved instance of a worker's cottage, built c. 1855.  It was occupied until the 1870s by Michael Foley, a shoemaker who may have worked at the nearby Tidd shoe factory.  It is a two-story wood-frame structure, with a front-gable roof, clapboard siding, and granite foundation.  Its front facade has three narrow bays on the first floor and two on the second, with the entrance in the rightmost bay.  Decorative woodwork is minimal.

The cottage was listed on the National Register of Historic Places in 1984.

See also
National Register of Historic Places listings in Stoneham, Massachusetts
National Register of Historic Places listings in Middlesex County, Massachusetts

References

Houses on the National Register of Historic Places in Stoneham, Massachusetts
Houses in Stoneham, Massachusetts